Hippotion brennus is a moth of the  family Sphingidae. It is known from the Moluccas, Papua New Guinea, the Solomon Islands and north-eastern Australia.

References

Hippotion
Moths described in 1782